The 2018 Liège–Bastogne–Liège was a road cycling one-day race that took place on 22 April 2018 in Belgium. It was the 104th edition of the Liège–Bastogne–Liège and the eighteenth event of the 2018 UCI World Tour.

The race was won by the champion of Luxembourg, Bob Jungels, who escaped on the Côte de la Roche-aux-Faucons. Canadian rider Michael Woods, riding for the  team, won the sprint for second place ahead of 's Romain Bardet for France.

Teams
As Liège–Bastogne–Liège was a UCI World Tour event, all eighteen UCI WorldTeams were invited automatically and obliged to enter a team in the race. Seven UCI Professional Continental teams competed as wildcards, completing the 25-team peloton.

Result

References

External links

2018 UCI World Tour
2018 in Belgian sport
2018
April 2018 sports events in Europe